Kenza Bennaceur (born January 14, 1976) is an Algerian former swimmer, who specialized in butterfly and in individual medley events. She won two bronze medals in the 200 m butterfly (2:33.54) and 400 m individual medley (5:29.60) at the 1999 All-Africa Games in Johannesburg, South Africa.

Bennaceur competed only in the women's 100 m butterfly at the 2000 Summer Olympics in Sydney. She achieved a FINA B-cut of 1:07.00 from the All-Africa Games. Swimming in heat two, Bennaceur decided to scratch out from the race, and then withdrew from the Games for personal and health reasons on the first day of prelims.

References

External links
Olympic Profile

1976 births
Living people
Algerian female swimmers
Olympic swimmers of Algeria
Swimmers at the 2000 Summer Olympics
Female butterfly swimmers
Female medley swimmers
Sportspeople from Algiers
African Games bronze medalists for Algeria
African Games medalists in swimming
Competitors at the 1999 All-Africa Games
21st-century Algerian women
20th-century Algerian women